J. Randolph "Randy" Lewis (born ) is an American businessman, a disability employment advocate, and author.

Lewis is a former senior vice president of a Fortune 50 company, and board member of a national restaurant chain. He was the head of supply chain and logistics at Walgreens for 17 years until his retirement in 2013. Over his last ten years there, he created a program in its distribution centers to integrate large numbers of people with disabilities as equals into its workforce.

Early life and education 
Lewis was born in Texas circa 1950. He earned his Bachelor of Applied Arts degree in accounting in 1971, a Bachelor of Arts degree in economics in 1974, and a Master of Business Administration degree in finance in 1975, all from the University of Texas at Austin, located in Austin, Texas. Lewis joined the Peace Corps and was stationed in Peru.

Career

Ernst & Young
Lewis was a Chicago-based partner at Ernst & Young and Walgreens was his client by the late 1980s. His primary client in 1992, Walgreens offered him a position.

Walgreens
Lewis joined Walgreens in 1992 as divisional vice president, logistics and planning and promoted to vice president to head its supply chain in 1996. He was promoted to senior vice president in 1999. During his time there, Walgreens expanded from 1,500 to 8,000 stores. When he took over in 1996, Walgreens began to contract outside agencies that employed people with disabilities in its distribution centers on a limited basis, typically in non-production areas.

List of other companies who have implemented this program

 Best Buy
 C. & J. Clark (traded as Clarks)
 Lowe's
 Marks & Spencer
 Meijer
 OfficeMax
 Procter & Gamble
 Sears

Personal life 
His son, Austin, has autism which may have led Lewis to note the importance of employment for those with disabilities.

Recognition 

 Brain & Behavior Research Foundation (then NARSAD) first Productive Lives Award – 2009
 Milton P. Levy, Jr. Outstanding Volunteer Award Winner (Special Care & Career Services) – 2010
 Walgreens recognized as Private-Sector Employer of the Year for People with Disabilities – 2010
 Leader of the Year – Human Resources Management Association of Chicago – 2010 
 Walgreens recognized as Diversity Council Honors Award Winner – 2011 
 Human Spirit Award from Georgetown University Conference on Employment of People With Disabilities – 2013

Books, talks, and miscellaneous 

 No Greatness Without Goodness: How a Father's Love Changed a Company and Sparked a Movement by Randy Lewis  
 Lewis has a contribution in the book Able! How One Company's Extraordinary Workforce Changed the Way We Look at Disability Today by Nancy Henderson  	
 Testimony before the Committee on Health, Education, Labor and Pensions on March 2, 2011, at 10 a.m. transcript and full hearing video 	
 Business & Disability: Walgreens – Randy Lewis on integration of people with disabilities 
 "Employees at This Walgreens Distribution Center Are More Able Than Disabled", ABC News
 "Walgreens Program Puts 'Able' in Disabled", NBC News

See also 

 List of people from Chicago
 List of University of Texas at Austin alumni

References

External links 
 NogWog

Year of birth missing (living people)
Place of birth missing (living people)
1950s births
20th-century American businesspeople
20th-century American non-fiction writers
21st-century American businesspeople
21st-century American non-fiction writers
American accountants
American corporate directors
American expatriates in Peru
American businesspeople in retailing
Businesspeople from Chicago
Businesspeople from Texas
American disability rights activists
Ernst & Young
Living people
Peace Corps volunteers
McCombs School of Business alumni
Writers from Chicago
Writers from Texas
20th-century American male writers
American male non-fiction writers
21st-century American male writers